Lovro Ščrbec (born 30 January 1990) is a Croatian football forward, currently playing for NK Lukavec.

Club career
Lovro Ščrbec was one of the best players in Croatian U-18 national team. In the 2006–07 season with cadets team of NK Zagreb he was Champion of Croatia. Thanks to his excellent season in Croatian Cadets Championship together with his younger brother Filip Šćrbec he was invited in training center of Italian football giant Milan, where he has had successful trial (test games), but because of problems for getting EU visa for younger than 18 years, he had to return to Croatia. He later had a spell in the Austrian lower leagues.

Personal life
His younger brother Filip plays for Vinogradar.

References

External links
 
 Lovro Scrbec  profile at Sportnet.hr 

1990 births
Living people
Footballers from Zagreb
Association football forwards
Croatian footballers
Croatia youth international footballers
C.D. Nacional players
NK Rudeš players
NK Lokomotiva Zagreb players
HNK Gorica players
NK Vinogradar players
NK Zelina players
Croatian Football League players
First Football League (Croatia) players
Austrian 2. Landesliga players
Croatian expatriate footballers
Expatriate footballers in Portugal
Croatian expatriate sportspeople in Portugal
Expatriate footballers in Austria
Croatian expatriate sportspeople in Austria